Dinteville may refer to:

 François de Dinteville (1498–1530), French Catholic bishop of Auxerre
 François de Dinteville (1498-1554), French bishop of Auxerre, brother of Jean de Dinteville
 Jean de Dinteville (1504–1555), French diplomat
 Dinteville, Haute-Marne, French commune